Only "Old Men" Are Going Into Battle (one of the meanings of the Russian idiom 'old man' is 'most experienced person') is an iconic 1973 Soviet war drama black-and-white film produced in the USSR about World War II fighter pilots, written and directed by Leonid Bykov, who also played the lead role as the squadron commander.

Screenplay by Leonid Bykov, Yevgeny Onopriyenko and Aleksandr Satsky.

Original music by Viktor Shevchenko, cinematography by Vladimir Voytenko. Runtime 92 min. Production by Dovzhenko Film Studios.

Plot 
The film combines two storylines: the main war drama plot runs in parallel with vivid artistic performance — the fighter squadron doubles as an amateur musical group during rest time, led by its enthusiastic commander turned conductor.

The title comes from two scenes in the film, where the squadron is facing very difficult dogfights with German fighter planes, so only "old men" are sent up, while those fresh from flying school have to wait on the ground together with the mechanics. Soon, of course, the newcomers have replaced most of those veterans and have become "old men" themselves, taking to the skies while a new group of newcomers wait on the ground with the mechanics.

Plot Summary 

The movie begins in the late summer of 1943 during the Battle of the Dnieper.

The pilots of the 2nd Squadron of the Fighter Aircraft Guard Regiment are returning from the mission. However, the commanding officer, captain Titarenko, also known as "Maestro," is missing. Nobody (except for Makarych, the technician) even hopes he survived, since he didn't even have enough fuel, but then suddenly the German Messerschmitt Bf 109 shows up and lands on the airfield. It turns out that Maestro was shot down behind enemy lines, however, the advancing USSR infantry saved him and he received a war trophy aircraft on an advance airfield.

The next day the reinforcements come to the regiment and are being assigned to the squadrons. Several newcomers, including Second Lieutenant Aleksandrov and Third Lieutenants Shchedronov and Sagdullayev, ask for a place in the 2nd Squadron. Titarenko inquires about their musical skills: 2nd Squadron is also known as the "Singing Squadron," as during free time they perform as an amateur orchestra with the commander himself acting as conductor. Shchedronov sings «Darkie», earning the corresponding nickname.

Having only had a brief chat with the reinforcements, the "old men" take off to intercept a group of German bombers. Experienced pilots don't allow the newcomers with them, saying only "you’ll have your share of fighting soon enough:" they know that the new pilots have only received basic training due to a shortened curriculum and are not battle-ready.

They all return to the airfield safely, however, Maestro is furious: his wingman, First Lieutenant Skvortzov, left the battle without a permit, and it appears he did so not for the first time. They have a serious discussion and it turns out that during the Battle of Kursk Skvortzov had barely survived an encounter with a German ace pilot and since then has had a subconscious fear of dogfights. Depressed Skvortzov asks to be released from active duty and to be enlisted to an infantry regiment instead, however, Titarenko burns the report, deciding to give his friend another chance.

In between missions, the 2nd Squadron rehearses performances. Even Aleksandrov, despite his aversion to music, plays the tambourine and soon begins to run the rehearsals in lieu of the captain.

Eventually, the newcomers are allowed to fly. Aleksandrov crash lands his aircraft, destroying it in the process and receives a strict reprimand from the captain. However, he doesn't take it seriously and light-heartedly goes to the field to catch some grasshoppers. Enraged Titarenko suspends the lieutenant from flying and puts him on "eternal airfield duty," while the rest of the officers give Aleksandrov the nickname Grasshopper."

Titarenko leaves on a reconnaissance mission on a trophy Messerschmitt. In his absence, a light bomber Polikarpov Po-2, piloted by female officers Zoya and Masha, takes a forced landing on the airfield. Sagdullayev promptly falls in love with Masha, earning himself the nickname "Romeo."

Titarenko, who has returned from his recon mission, confirms that a large group of German tanks is nearby. When he decides the new reinforcements (except for Grasshopper) are battle-ready, he performs another reconnaissance flight. He finds out that the Germans have camouflaged their tanks with hay bales and sheds, but he's shot down on his way back. Maestro is saved by an allied infantry, which, however, mistakes him for a German pilot. They aren't persuaded by his Soviet uniform nor by his fluency in Russian, and attempt to lynch him. However, when an infantryman slaps Titarenko in the face, he punches the soldier back, knocking him to his knees and answered in a mat manner — that reassures the rest of the soldiers, who are sure that a German doesn't know the lexis like this.

The infantrymen gift the captain a horse, which he uses to get back to the airfield. Having returned, he learns from Makarych that during his absence Darkie has been killed: he was practicing cooperative actions with his partner and was shot down by a Focke-Wulf Fw 190 ace.

In the meantime, Romeo confesses his love to Masha.

Titarenko joins CPSU and receives a task to lead the newcomers by example and to demonstrate to them the vulnerability of Göring's ace pilots. Maestro challenges the Germans to a "joust," but at the very beginning of the fight he decides that this is the last opportunity for his wingman to prove himself. Titarenko feigns a weapon malfunction, putting himself in a mortal peril, and Skvortzov overcomes his fear and comes to the rescue, shooting down one of the enemy aircraft.

The next day, German air forces perform a raid on the airfield. Still suspended from flights, Grasshopper steals the commander's fighter, takes off and shoots down an enemy aircraft, saving the base.

The squadron gives a performance, which, among others, is attended by female pilots from a nearby regiment. Skvortzov performs the song Moonlight Night. The next day he performs a suicide ramming attack, directing his flaming aircraft at an enemy railway.

More time passes. The USSR territory is almost completely liberated from German occupation. The «old men» are preparing for battle, however, this now includes Romeo (First Lieutenant, Maestro's wingman) and Grasshopper (First Lieutenant, 2nd Squadron commander), while Maestro himself is now a major and a regiment commander. Fifteen minutes before takeoff, Romeo asks Maestro's permission to get married (since both he and Masha could be shot down any day) which Meastro gives right away. Once again the "old men" take off, and the newcomers from the reinforcements are left on the airfield.

The regiment returns from the mission, but it turns out that Romeo is heavily wounded. He manages to make it to the airfield and lands safely, but succumbs to his wounds right afterwards. When Maestro, Makarych and Grasshopper go to the female regiment to deliver the sad news to Masha, they learn that both Masha and Zoya were also killed that day. Makarych and Titarenko locate the women's graves and promise to return here and sing "Darkie" once again "from the beginning to the end" once the war is over.

Cast 

 Leonid Bykov as «Maestro» Titarenko, commander of the 2nd Singing squadron
 Sergey Podgorny as «Darkie» Shchedronov, fighter pilot
 Sergei Ivanov as «Grasshopper» Aleksandrov, fighter pilot
 Rustam Sagdullayev as «Romeo» Sagdullayev, fighter pilot
 Yevgeniya Simonova as Masha, female bomber navigator
 Olga Mateshko as Zoya, female bomber pilot
 Vladimir Talashko as Skvortzov, fighter pilot, Maestro's wingman and best friend
 Aleksei Smirnov as Makarych, Maestro's technician
 Viktor Miroshnichenko as Pop, the fighter regiment commander
 Alim Fedorinsky as Alyabyev, fighter pilot
 Vano Yantbelidze as Vano, fighter pilot
 Aleksandr Nemchenko as Ivan Fedorovich, fighter pilot
 Vilori Pashchenko as Vorobyev, fighter pilot
 Gregory Hlady as Grasshopper's technician
 Vladimir Volkov as political officer
 Dmitri Mirgorodskiy as infantry captain
 Yuri Sarantsev as Air Division commander
 Valentin Grudinin as chief of Air Army intelligence department
 Alexandr Milutin as fighter pilot

Script and production 
Leonid Bykov's childhood dream of becoming a pilot inspired his making of the film.

The story is based on the memoirs of the Soviet fighter ace Vitaly Popkov who fought with a real-life singing squadron boasting its own amateur choir. The squadron even toured the Soviet rear with concerts and received fighter planes built with money donated by Soviet star musicians.

Most of the elder cast and production members fought in the war themselves. Actor Aleksei Smirnov (Makarych) was a decorated war hero, an artillery sergeant; also a battlefield amateur musician as well.

Awards 
The film won most of the Soviet bloc film prizes at the time, including the first prize in the 7th All-Union Film Festival in Baku in 1974.

Colorization 
In 2009 a colorized version was released for TV and DVD, which resulted in a legal battle in Ukrainian courts between the copyright owners, Leonid Bykov's daughter and Ukrainian Dovzhenko Film Studios, and the company behind the colorization, as the copyright owners claim that the colorization has been done against the wishes of Bykov, who intentionally chose to do the film in black and white, in order to match newly shot scenes with the newsreel material in the film. In May 2011, the District Court of Kiev ruled that the colorization was a breach of copyright and that the colorized version can't be shown or rented in Ukraine. The director re-worked the film's script to suit being shot in black and white after being denied color film stock on the grounds that color film was reserved for films about socialist realism.

References

External links 

 
 Page about the film on the Leonid Bykov website (in Russian)

1973 films
1973 drama films
1970s war drama films
1970s musical drama films
Soviet war drama films
Soviet black-and-white films
Soviet historical drama films
Soviet musical drama films
Ukrainian black-and-white films
Ukrainian historical drama films
Ukrainian war drama films
Films set in 1943
Films set in Ukraine
Films set in the Soviet Union
Films shot in Ukraine
Dovzhenko Film Studios films
World War II aviation films
Russian aviation films
Eastern Front of World War II films
Russian-language Ukrainian films
Russian war drama films
Russian black-and-white films
Russian musical drama films
Ukrainian musical drama films
Russian World War II films
Soviet World War II films
Ukrainian World War II films